The Palace of Viceroy Laserna (also known as Palace of the Counts of the Andes) is a palace in Jerez de la Frontera, Andalusia, Spain. It has a neoclassical style, with details from previous styles.

History 

The palace is built on top of the foundations of an arab palace. After refurbishment work in the building, a plaster of the Nasrid dynasty of the XIII century was found. The palace has been in the same family since the reconquest of Jerez in the XIII century. In the XVIII century it went through a refurbishment that gave it the neoclassical aspect that it has today. Also in the XVIII century José de la Serna y Martínez de Hinojosa, first Count of the Andes and last Viceroy of Peru was born in the house. The palace is named Palace of Viceroy Laserna, in his honor. Since then it has been the residence of the Counts of the Andes.

Maintenance 

The Palace is in a great state of maintenance, due to having been the traditional residence of the noble title Conde de los Andes (Count of the Andes) and being inhabited

Heritage 

The Palace has many pieces of art.  It has been opened for visits since April 2015.

Annexed building 

In 1925, because of the Canonical Coronation of Our Lady of Mount Carmel in Jerez de la Frontera, the VI Count of the Andes, Francisco Moreno Zuleta, ordered the construction of a new building annexed to the Palace to host the government that went to the event. This building is now a part of the Palace and has a small hotel nowadays.

Corral de comedias 

During the XVII century there was a Corral de comedias where the garden of the Palace is now. It had is entrance on the Street Santa Isabel.

References

External links 

 Vídeo de visita guiada
 En casa del Conde de los Andes
 Destino Jerez, programa 10

Buildings and structures in Jerez de la Frontera
Neoclassical architecture in Andalusia